The Indiana Biosciences Research Institute (IBRI) is an American nonprofit translational research organization headquartered in Indianapolis, Indiana, United States within the 16 Tech Innovation District. The IBRI is the nation's first industry-led collaborative life sciences research institute.
Its primary focus is on better understanding the pathogenesis of type 1 and type 2 diabetes to translate this knowledge into novel therapies, while also expanding into other metabolic diseases that share common systems and pathways.

History
In 2012, pharmaceutical executive John C. Lechleiter from Eli Lilly & Company initially proposed the IBRI. In 2013, Indiana governor Mike Pence announced the formation of the IBRI. Pence later worked with life sciences leaders to secure $25 million in startup funds from the state.

In 2015, the IBRI hired David Broecker as CEO. In late 2015, the Indianapolis City-County Council approved $75 million to build a technology park called 16 Tech. In 2016, the IBRI hired Rainer Fischer as Chief Scientific Officer. In 2017, Governor Eric Holcomb reaffirmed the commitment made by his predecessor Mike Pence.

Leadership

Appointees to the IBRI’s Board of Directors include:
 Robert Bernhard, University of Notre Dame
 Wayne Burris, Roche Diagnostics
 Kenneth Custer, Eli Lilly & Company
 Daniel Evans Jr., Indiana University Health
 Tatiana Foroud, Indiana University School of Medicine
 Jay Hess, Indiana University
 David Ingram, Indiana University Health
 Cris Johnston, Indiana Office of Management and Budget
 John Lechleiter, Eli Lilly & Company
 Patricia Martin, BioCrossroads, Inc.
 Theresa Mayer, Purdue University
 Hany Moselhi, Roche Diagnostics
 Alan Palkowitz, IBRI
 Dan Peterson, Cook Group
 Aaron Schacht, BiomEdit, LLC
 Wendy Srnic, Corteva
 Bill Stephan, Indiana University

References

External links
 
 IBRI on Facebook
 IBRI on Instagram
 IBRI on LinkedIn
 IBRI on Twitter

2013 establishments in Indiana
Research institutes established in 2013
Science and technology in Indiana